The 2020–21 Moroccan Throne Cup was the 65th staging of the Moroccan Throne Cup, the main knockout football tournament in Morocco.

RS Berkane won the final 3–2 over Wydad AC on penalties following a 0–0 draw after extra time for their second Thron Cup title.

Preliminary round

Third round
The fourth round was played on 23–24 February 2022.

|}

Fourth round
The fourth round was played on 2–3 March 2022.

|}

Final phase

Qualified teams
The following teams competed in the 2020–21 Moroccan Throne Cup.

16 teams of 2020–21 Botola

AS FAR
Chabab Mohammédia
Difaâ El Jadidi
FUS Rabat
Hassania Agadir
IR Tanger
Maghreb de Fès
Moghreb Tétouan
Mouloudia Oujda
Nahdat Zemamra
Olympic Safi
Raja Casablanca
Rapide Oued Zem
RSB Berkane
Wydad Casablanca
Youssoufia Berrechid

8 teams of 2020–21 Botola 2

Chabab Atlas Khénifra
Jeunesse Sportive Soualem
Ittihad Khemisset
Kawkab Marrakech
Raja Beni Mellal
Tihad Casablanca
Union de Touarga
Wydad de Fès

5 teams of 2020–21 Division National

Association Al Mansoria
JS de Kasbah Tadla
JS Massira
Union Sidi Kacem
US Témara

2 teams of 2020–21 Amateur Division I

Fath Casablanca (North Group)
Ittifaq Marrakech (South group)

1 team of 2020–21 Amateur Division II

US Amal Tiznit (South group)

Bracket
Draw of the 2020–21 Moroccan Throne Cup final phase

Round of 32
Draw of the 2020–21 Moroccan Throne Cup round of 32

The Round of 32 matches were played on 11–13 March, and 5–6 April 2022.

Round of 16
The Round of 16 matches were played on 18–21 March, and 9–10 April 2022.

Quarter-finals
The Quarter-finals matches were played on 28–29 May, and 7 July 2022.

Semifinals
The Semifinals matches will be played on 19-20 July 2022 at the Fez Stadium.

Final 
<onlyinclude>

References

External links
Coupe du Trone: Résultats, frmf.ma
Moroccan Cup 2019 - 2020, Goalzz.com

Morocco
Coupe
Coupe